Events from the year 1949 in art.

Events
 Formation of Penwith Society of Arts in St Ives, Cornwall.
 Philadelphia Artists Equity is established in Pennsylvania, United States, to protect artists' rights and improve working and economic conditions for fine artists.
 Young Contemporaries exhibition, initiated by Carel Weight for the British Society of Artists Galleries, establishes the New Contemporaries series.
 David Jones begins a 5-year sequence of watercolours of flowers in glasses.
 Yves Klein paints his first monochromes, while apprenticed to a picture-frame maker in London.

Awards
 Archibald Prize: Arthur Murch – Bonar Dunlop

Works
 Francis Bacon – Head III, Head IV, Head V, Head VI
 Brenda Chamberlain – The Fisherman's Return (National Museum of Wales)
 Salvador Dalí
 Leda Atomica
 The Madonna of Port Lligat (original version; Haggerty Museum of Art, Milwaukee, Wisconsin)
 Paul Delvaux – The Temple
 Sir William Reid Dick – Lady Godiva (equestrian bronze, Coventry)
 Sir Russell Drysdale – West Wyalong
 Frida Kahlo
 Diego and I
 The Love Embrace of the Universe, the Earth (Mexico), Myself, Diego, and Señor Xolotl
 Tadeusz Kantor – Man with Umbrella
 Wifredo Lam = Femme avec un Oiseau
 L. S. Lowry
 The Canal Bridge
 The Football Match
 The Spire
 Henry Moore – Family Group (first casting)
 Robert Motherwell – Five in the Afternoon
 Barnett Newman – Abraham
Pablo Picasso – Dove
 William Scott
 Frying Pan and Eggs
 Still Life with Candlestick
 Graham Sutherland – Somerset Maugham
 Steffen Thomas – Statue of Eugene Talmadge
 Vladimir Tretchikoff – The Dying Swan
 Boris Vladimirski – Roses for Stalin
 Lucien Wercollier – Le prisonnier politique (bronze)
 Andrzej Wróblewski – Execution V

Births
 February 17 – Peter Kennard, English photomontage artist
 February 18 – Charlie Waite, English landscape photographer
 March 11 – Griselda Pollock, South African-born feminist visual art historian and theorist
 April 9 – Stephen Hickman, American illustrator, sculptor and author
 May 7 – Deborah Butterfield, American sculptor
 May 12 – Ross Bleckner, American painter
 July 6 – Tibor Kalman, Hungarian-American graphic designer (d. 1999)
 August 12 – Glòria Muñoz, Spanish painter
 August 15 – Richard Deacon, British sculptor
 August 27 – Istvan Kantor, Hungarian-Canadian performance artist
 Jim Dolan, American sculptor
 P. K. Mahanandia, Indian-born portrait artist
 Lincoln Perry -American painter, muralist, and sculptor

Deaths

 March 17 – Aleksandra Ekster, painter and designer, Art Deco pioneer (b. 1882)
 May 3 – Mariano Fortuny, fashion designer (b. 1871)
 May 15 – Henri Beau, Canadian Impressionist painter (b. 1863)
 June 21 – Edward Wadsworth, English Vorticist painter (b. 1889)
 August 8 – Joaquín Torres García, Uruguayan painter (b. 1874)
 September 7 - José Clemente Orozco, Mexican painter and illustrator (b. 1883)
 September 25 – Henri Manguin, painter (b. 1874)
 November 3 – Solomon R. Guggenheim, art collector (b. 1861)
 November 19 – James Ensor, painter (b. 1860)
 November 27 – Vincenzo Irolli, Italian painter (b. 1860)
 December 28 – Emília dos Santos Braga, Portuguese painter (b. 1867)
 (Herbert Barnard) John Everett, English marine artist (b. 1877)

See also
 1949 in Fine Arts of the Soviet Union

References

 
Years of the 20th century in art
1940s in art